Lauder in Berwickshire was a royal burgh that returned one commissioner to the Parliament of Scotland and to the Convention of Estates.

After the Acts of Union 1707, Lauder, North Berwick, Dunbar, Haddington and Jedburgh formed the Haddington district of burghs, returning one member between them to the House of Commons of Great Britain.

List of burgh commissioners

 1661: Thomas Wood, bailie 
 1665 convention: Robert Wood, bailie 
 1667 convention, 1669: John Maitland, bailie 
 1670–74: Thomas Wood, bailie 
 1678 convention, 1685–86: Alexander Home 
 1681–82: Charles Lauder of Park, merchant 
 1689 convention, 1689–1702: David Maitland of Soutra 
 1702–07: Sir David Cunynghame of Milncraig

References

See also
 List of constituencies in the Parliament of Scotland at the time of the Union

Constituencies of the Parliament of Scotland (to 1707)
Constituencies disestablished in 1707
1707 disestablishments in Scotland
History of the Scottish Borders
Politics of the Scottish Borders